Annabelle Davis (born 28 March 1997) is an English actress. She portrayed Sasha Bellman in the CBBC series The Dumping Ground from 2015 to 2022, and from 2023, she is set to play Lacey Lloyd in the Channel 4 soap opera Hollyoaks. She is the daughter of actor and TV presenter Warwick Davis and Samantha Davis.

Early life and education
Annabelle Davis is the only daughter of Samantha (née Burroughs) and actor Warwick Davis. She has a younger brother Harrison (born 28 February 2003). She has an older brother Lloyd (11 September 1991 – 20 September 1991), who died in infancy after the birth in 9 days. Davis inherited spondyloepiphyseal dysplasia congenita from her father. 

Davis attended Sawtry Village Academy, where she took A-Levels in Media, Textiles, Art and IT. In June 2018, she was announced as a new patron for the Young People Counselling Service. She is the namesake of their first community hub.

Career
In 2011, Davis appeared in Harry Potter and the Deathly Hallows – Part 2 as a Naughty Goblin. She then joined the CBBC series The Dumping Ground as Sasha Bellman in 2015. She reprised the role of Sasha in spin-off series The Dumping Ground: I'm..., a webisode series. She has also appeared in two Star Wars films alongside her father. In 2022, after her final appearance on The Dumping Ground had aired, it was announced that Davis had been cast as Lacey Lloyd in the Channel 4 soap opera Hollyoaks. She is set to make her debut appearance in 2023.

Filmography

Awards and nominations

References

External links
 

1997 births
Living people
English television actresses
English child actresses
British child actresses
21st-century English actresses
People from Peterborough
Actors with dwarfism